Mike Law may refer to:

 Mike Law (Canadian football), Canadian football defensive back
 Mike Law (lacrosse) (born 1979), former lacrosse player and political candidate in the state of Colorado
 Mike Law (climber), Australian rockclimber

See also
Michael Andrew Law (born 1982), Hong Kong artist
Michael Laws (born 1957), New Zealand politician, broadcaster and writer/columnist